Aleksandr Borisovich Kosarev (born 30 September 1977) is a Russian volleyball player, a member of Russia men's national volleyball team and Russian club Belogorie Belgorod.

Kosarev competed at the 2004 Summer Olympics in Athens, Greece, where Russia claimed the bronze medal by defeating the United States in the play-off for third place.

References

External links
 
 
 

1977 births
Living people
People from Belgorod
Russian men's volleyball players
Volleyball players at the 2004 Summer Olympics
Volleyball players at the 2008 Summer Olympics
Medalists at the 2004 Summer Olympics
Medalists at the 2008 Summer Olympics
Olympic medalists in volleyball
Olympic volleyball players of Russia
Olympic bronze medalists for Russia
Sportspeople from Belgorod Oblast